U.S. Route 17 (US 17) is a part of the U.S. Highway System that runs from Punta Gorda, Florida to Winchester, Virginia.  In Virginia, the U.S. Highway runs  from the North Carolina state line in Chesapeake north to its northern terminus at US 11, US 50, and US 522 in Winchester.  US 17 is a major highway in the eastern half of Virginia.  The U.S. Highway connects the Albemarle Region of North Carolina with the Hampton Roads metropolitan area.  Within the urban area, US 17 passes through the South Hampton Roads cities of Chesapeake, Portsmouth, and Suffolk and the Virginia Peninsula city of Newport News.  Between Yorktown and Fredericksburg, the U.S. Highway serves as the primary highway of the Middle Peninsula.  At Fredericksburg, US 17 leaves the Atlantic coastal plain; the highway passes through the Piedmont town of Warrenton and crosses the Blue Ridge Mountains on its way to Winchester in the Shenandoah Valley.The route from Tappahannock to  Winchester roughly follows the Confederate March during the Civil War to Gettysburg.

Route description

Chesapeake to Portsmouth
US 17 enters Virginia at the North Carolina state line adjacent to the Dismal Swamp Canal in a rural area east of Great Dismal Swamp National Wildlife Refuge and northwest of Elizabeth City.  The U.S. Highway heads north through the city of Chesapeake as George Washington Highway, a four-lane divided highway that veers away from the canal and passes by Chesapeake Regional Airport.  North of the highway's split with US 17 Business, which follows George Washington Highway through the Chesapeake community of Deep Creek, US 17 curves northeast as Dominion Boulevard and reduces to two lanes.  The highway temporarily expands to a divided highway around its intersection with SR 165 (Cedar Road), then crosses the Southern Branch Elizabeth River on the newly constructed Veterans Bridge, replacing the former double-leaf bascule drawbridge known commonly as the Steel Bridge.  US 17 meets the southern end of SR 166 (Bainbridge Boulevard) just north of the bridge.

US 17 expands to a four-lane divided highway again at its intersection with SR 190 (Great Bridge Boulevard).  Just east of that intersection, US 17 enters a combination cloverleaf-directional interchange with SR 168, which heads south as the Oak Grove Connector toward the Outer Banks; I-64, which follows the southern segment of the Hampton Roads Beltway, and I-464, which heads north toward downtown Norfolk.  US 17 becomes concurrent with I-64 in the direction of Suffolk (technically eastbound, but heading west).  The four-lane freeway crosses the Southern Branch on the High Rise Bridge.  I-64 and US 17 diverge at a cloverleaf interchange with George Washington Highway, which heads south as US 17 Business.  I-64 continues west toward its junction with I-664 at Bowers Hill while US 17 heads north on the four-lane divided highway.

US 17 crosses over Norfolk Southern Railway's Norfolk District and intersects Military Highway, which carries US 13 and US 460.  The U.S. Highway continues as a three-lane road with a center left-turn lane to the north end of SR 196 (Canal Drive), where the highway becomes five lanes and crosses St. Julian Creek.  US 17 enters the city of Portsmouth at its at-grade crossing of another Norfolk Southern rail line.  The highway becomes a four-lane divided highway at SR 239 (Victory Boulevard).  At Paradise Creek, SR 141 continues along George Washington Highway while US 17 turns northwest onto Frederick Boulevard.  The highway parallels a rail line through its intersection with SR 337 (Portsmouth Boulevard), then veers away from the railroad to meet I-264 at a partial cloverleaf interchange with a flyover ramp from southbound US 17 to the eastbound Interstate.

Portsmouth to Yorktown
US 17 has another at-grade railroad crossing before the highway intersects SR 337 Alternate (Turnpike Road).  Just north of its oblique intersection with US 58, US 17 turns west onto High Street.  The four-lane undivided highway crosses the Western Branch Elizabeth River on the Churchland Bridge.  US 17 becomes a divided highway again in the community of Churchland, where the highway intersects another rail line between its intersections with Churchland Boulevard.  The U.S. Highway briefly passes through Chesapeake again, where the highway is named Western Branch Boulevard, before the highway enters the city of Suffolk and becomes Bridge Road.  US 17 meets the southern end of SR 135 (College Drive) and crosses another rail line.  The highway has a partial interchange with I-664 (Hampton Roads Beltway) just south of the Interstate's interchange with SR 164 (Western Freeway).  Access to SR 164 is provided by a partial interchange to the west of I-664.  Access from westbound SR 164 to southbound US 17 is provided via SR 135.

US 17 crosses Bennett Creek and curves north.  The highway reduces to two lanes to cross the Nansemond River on the Nansemond River Bridge, which is also named for Mills E. Godwin.  US 17 passes through the community of Crittenden before using the two-lane Crittenden Bridge to cross Chuckatuck Creek into Isle of Wight County.  The highway continues northwest as Carrollton Boulevard, name for the Carrollton community within which US 17 intersects US 258 and SR 32 (Brewers Neck Boulevard).  The three highways curve northeast and cross the James River on the four-lane James River Bridge.  At the Newport News end of the bridge, US 17, US 258, and SR 32 continue as six-lane Mercury Boulevard, which has a partial cloverleaf interchange with US 60 (Warwick Boulevard), crosses over CSX's Peninsula Subdivision, and has an intersection with SR 143 (Jefferson Avenue), where SR 32 ends and US 258 continues along Mercury Boulevard through Hampton.

US 17 turns north to join SR 143 on six-lane Jefferson Avenue.  The two highways intersect SR 152 (Main Street) and SR 306 (Harpersville Road), which continues east as Hampton Roads Center Parkway.  US 17 and SR 143 diverge at J. Clyde Morris Boulevard, which heads west as SR 312.  The U.S. Highway heads northeast along the six-lane boulevard through a cloverleaf interchange with I-64.  US 17 reduces to four lanes as it crosses Brick Kiln Creek into York County, where the highway becomes George Washington Memorial Highway.  Within Tabb, the U.S. Highway intersects SR 171 (Victory Boulevard) and meets the northern end of SR 134 (Hampton Highway) at a trumpet interchange.  US 17 crosses the Poquoson River just east of its impoundment, Hardwoods Mill Reservoir, then passes through Grafton, where the highway intersects SR 173 (Denbigh Boulevard) and SR 105 (Fort Eustis Boulevard).  North of Harris Grove, the U.S. Highway enters Colonial National Historical Park.  Within the federal property to the west of Yorktown, US 17 intersects SR 238 and has an interchange with Colonial Parkway.  The U.S. Highway crosses the York River on the George P. Coleman Memorial Bridge, a double swing bridge that solicits a toll from motorists heading northbound into Gloucester County.

Yorktown to Fredericksburg

US 17 continues north through Gloucester Point, which is home to the Virginia Institute of Marine Science.  At the north end of the suburban community, the U.S. Highway meets the western end of SR 216 (Guinea Road).  US 17 continues through a suburban area to Gloucester Courthouse, which is directly served by US 17 Business (Main Street).  At US 17's northern intersection with the business route, the U.S. Highway becomes concurrent with SR 14 north to Adner, where the state highway heads west as Adner Road.  At Glenns, the highway has an intersection with SR 198 (Glenns Road) and SR 33 (Lewis Puller Memorial Highway).  US 17 and SR 33 head north together and cross the Dragon Swamp, which becomes the Piankatank River, into Middlesex County and assume the name Tidewater Trail.  The two highways diverge at Saluda, into which SR 33 and US 17 Business head north as Gloucester Road.  US 17 collects the other end of the business route (School Street) on the west side of Saluda.
US 17 enters Essex County at the community of Laneview.  The U.S. Highway passes through Center Cross and Dunnsville and crosses Piscataway Creek before reaching Brays Fork, where the highway has a directional intersection with US 360 (Richmond Highway).  The two highways enter the town of Tappahannock and pass through a commercial strip as Tappahannock Boulevard.  US 17 and US 360 cross Hoskins Creek and pass through the downtown area as four-lane undivided Tidewater Trail.  At the north end of downtown, US 360 turns east onto Queen Street to cross the Rappahannock River to the Northern Neck.  US 17 expands to a divided highway and follows the west bank of the river before heading inland again after crossing Mount Landing Creek.  The U.S. Highway passes through the communities of Caret, Champlain, Chance, and Loretto before crossing Portobogo Creek into Caroline County.  US 17 passes through Etta ahead of its junction with US 301 (A.P. Hill Boulevard) at the town of Port Royal.

US 17 continues northwest as a two-lane road that follows the eastern boundary of Fort A.P. Hill.  The U.S. Highway passes through Rappahannock Academy, named for a defunct military school, Moss Neck, and Olney Corner before curving west.  US 17 becomes Mills Drive on entering Spotsylvania County.  At New Post, the highway intersects SR 2, which heads south as Sandy Lane Drive toward Bowling Green and north concurrent with US 17 Business as Tidewater Trail toward Fredericksburg.  US 17 crosses over CSX's RF&P Subdivision as it heads west to its junction with US 1 (Jefferson Davis Highway) at Massaponax.  The two U.S. Highways run together through a commercial area north to a partial cloverleaf interchange with I-95.  US 17 follows the six-lane Interstate north through a cloverleaf interchange with SR 3 (Germanna Highway) within the city of Fredericksburg and over the Rappahannock River on the Rappahannock Falls Bridge.  North of the river in Stafford County, US 17 separates from I-95 for the last time on its entire route and receives the northern end of US 17 Business at a cloverleaf interchange in Falmouth.

Fredericksburg to Winchester

US 17 continues northwest as Warrenton Road, a four-lane divided highway that passes businesses and heads northeast of a park and ride lot. The road enters more rural areas and passes through Berea, Paynes Corner, Hartwood, and Storck on its way to the Fauquier County line at Deep Run.  The U.S. Highway continues northwest as Marsh Road through Goldvein, Sumerduck, and Morrisville before crossing over Norfolk Southern Railway's Washington District and intersecting SR 28 (Catlett Road) in Bealeton.  At Opal, US 17 joins US 15 and US 29 (James Madison Highway) to head north to Warrenton.  At the three U.S. Highways' intersection with their respective business routes, the highway becomes a freeway.  US 17, US 15, and US 29 have a diamond interchange with SR 643 (Meetze Road/Lee Street) before the combination partial cloverleaf and directional interchange where US 17 diverges from US 15 and US 29, which head toward Washington as Lee Highway, and all three highways meet the northern end of US 15 Business and US 29 Business (Lee Highway), which are used to reach the eastern end of US 211.  US 17 briefly passes through the town limits of Warrenton while heading northwest to a partial interchange with the northern end of US 17 Business (James Madison Highway).

US 17 heads north out of Warrenton as James Madison Highway.  The highway follows Cedar Run through a gap between Waters Mountain and Pignut Mountain.  In Old Tavern, US 17 meets the southern end of SR 245 (Old Tavern Road).  The U.S. Highway continues northwest from Old Tavern as Winchester Road to the southern edge of Marshall, where the highway meets I-66 at a diamond interchange.  US 17 joins I-66 heading west while US 17 Business continues into the center of Marshall.  West of Marshall, I-66 and US 17 have an interchange with the other end of US 17 Business and SR 55.  The three highways head northwest along the freeway to Delaplane, where I-66 and the two other highways split.  Just north of the partial interchange, SR 55 (John Marshall Highway) diverges from US 17 to parallel I-66 toward Front Royal.  US 17 follows Winchester Road, a two-lane highway, through the center of Delaplane, where the U.S. Highway crosses Goose Creek and intersects Norfolk Southern's B-Line at grade.  The U.S. Highway continues north past the entrance to Sky Meadows State Park to its junction with US 50 (John Mosby Highway) in Paris.  US 17 runs concurrently with US 50 for the remainder of its course.

US 17 and US 50 become a divided highway that crosses the Blue Ridge Mountains at Ashby Gap and enters Clarke County.  The two highways descend the mountain to their crossing of the Shenandoah River at Berrys.  US 17 and US 50 intersect SR 255 (Bishop Meade Road) south of Millwood and US 340 (Lord Fairfax Highway) in the hamlet of Waterloo south of the town of Boyce.  The highway's name becomes Millwood Pike on crossing Opequon Creek into Frederick County.  Just east of Winchester, US 17 and US 50 intersect US 522 (Front Royal Pike) and ramps to and from northbound I-81.  The three U.S. Highways enter the city of Winchester at their half-cloverleaf interchange with southbound I-81.  The US routes follow Jubal Early Drive into Winchester, then turn right onto two-lane Millwood Avenue, which crosses CSX's Shenandoah Subdivision at grade before reaching US 17's northern terminus at the intersection of Cameron Street and Gerrard Street at the southern edge of downtown.  US 50, US 522, and US 11 head north along one-way Cameron Street to the center of Winchester; southbound US 11 is accessed via Gerrard Street. Signage however indicates US 17's northern terminus is along Cameron Street at Clifford Street.

Major intersections

See also
U.S. Route 117

References

External links

Virginia Highways Project: US 17

17
U.S. Route 017
U.S. Route 017
U.S. Route 017
U.S. Route 017
U.S. Route 017
U.S. Route 017
U.S. Route 017
U.S. Route 017
U.S. Route 017
U.S. Route 017
U.S. Route 017
U.S. Route 017
U.S. Route 017
U.S. Route 017
U.S. Route 017
U.S. Route 017
U.S. Route 017